Vietnam War Story II is a 1988 film that was released direct-to-video. The film consists of three 30 minute segments, each filmed by a different director. The first segment stars Wesley Snipes as a young soldier in the Vietnam War. The film was based on the television series, Vietnam War Story. The films directors are David Burton Morris, Jack Sholder and Michael Toshiyuki Uno.

Cast 
Cynthia Bain as Didi Sommers
Tate Donovan		
Tim Guinee		
Joseph Hieu as Sergeant Vinh
Wesley Snipes

External links

1988 films
American independent films
Vietnam War films
1988 drama films
1980s war films
Films directed by David Burton Morris
1980s English-language films
1980s American films